Dandrio is a settlement in the Blenio district, Switzerland.

Villages in Ticino